Chelker Reservoir is a man-made lake in North Yorkshire, England.  It lies in the parish of Draughton, immediately north of the A65 road, between Skipton and the village of Addingham.  It was put into service in 1866 and serves the Bradford area; it is currently owned by Yorkshire Water. The reservoir's main inflow is the River Wharfe.

Chelker Wind Farm 
In 1992 a wind farm, the third-ever in the United Kingdom, was erected on the north side of the reservoir.   The wind farm consisted of four two-bladed turbines which generated 1.2MW and went online in December 1992.  They were used to pump water from the River Wharfe up to the reservoir.

In 2013, after permission to enlarge the wind farm was refused, the turbines were demolished.

See also 

 List of lakes in England
 List of dams and reservoirs in United Kingdom

References

External links 
 Geograph.org photo
 The Windpower.net – Chelker Reservoir windfarm, United-Kingdom

Reservoirs in North Yorkshire